Arvind Trivedi (8 November 1938 – 6 October 2021) was an Indian actor and politician from Gujarat. He, alongside his brother Upendra Trivedi, was prolific in Gujarati cinema for over 40 years. He became a household name for playing the role of Ravana in television series Ramayan (1987). He was elected to the Lok Sabha, lower house of the Parliament of India from Sabarkantha, Gujarat as a member of the Bharatiya Janata Party.

Biography 
Arvind Trivedi was born on 8 November 1938 in Indore (now in Madhya Pradesh) to Jethalal Trivedi. He studied to Intermediate level at Bhavan's College in Bombay (now Mumbai). He married Nalini on 4 June 1966. They had three daughters. His brother Upendra Trivedi was also prolific Gujarati film actor.

He is known for portraying Ravan in Ramanand Sagar's television series Ramayan (1987). He acted in other TV series like Vikram Aur Betaal and others. The film Desh Re Joya Dada Pardesh Joya, in which he acted as Dadaji (grandfather), broke many box office records and he is still remembered for the role.

Trivedi acted in about 300 films including Hindi and Gujarati. He had acted in several social and mythological films.

In 1991, Arvind Trivedi was elected as a Member of Parliament from Sabarkatha constituency as a member of Bharatiya Janata Party and was in the office until 1996.

In 2002 he was named as the acting chairman of the Central Board for Film Certification (CBFC). Arvind Trivedi worked as CBFC chief from 20 July 2002 to 16 October 2003.

He had a heart attack around 9:30 on 6 October 2021. He died at his Kandivali residence in Mumbai.

Recognition 
Trivedi won seven awards for the best acting in Gujarati films awarded by the Government of Gujarat.

Selected filmography

Films

Television

References

External links 
Official biographical sketch in Parliament of India website

1938 births
2021 deaths
Indian actor-politicians
Gujarati people
India MPs 1991–1996
Lok Sabha members from Gujarat
Male actors from Gujarat
Bharatiya Janata Party politicians from Gujarat
People from Indore